Wythenshawe and Sale East is a parliamentary constituency in the city of Manchester and the borough of Trafford.  It returns one Member of Parliament (MP) to the House of Commons of the Parliament of the United Kingdom, elected by the first past the post system.

The constituency has always been a safe Labour seat, and the southern part of the constituency includes Manchester Airport. The current MP is Mike Kane of the Labour Party who was elected at the 2014 by-election in February 2014. He succeeded Labour's Paul Goggins who died in January 2014, and who had held the seat since its inception in 1997.

Boundaries 

1997–2010: The City of Manchester wards of Baguley, Benchill, Brooklands, Northenden, Sharston, and Woodhouse Park, and the Metropolitan Borough of Trafford wards of Brooklands, Priory, and Sale Moor.

2010–present: The City of Manchester wards of Baguley, Brooklands, Northenden, Sharston and Woodhouse Park, and the Metropolitan Borough of Trafford wards of Brooklands, Priory, and Sale Moor.

The constituency of Wythenshawe and Sale East is one of three in the Metropolitan Borough of Trafford and one of five in the City of Manchester, encompassing three of the five electoral wards in Sale and all five wards of Wythenshawe. The constituency was created at the 1997 general election combining all of the former Manchester Wythenshawe constituency with the Sale parts of the Altrincham and Sale and Davyhulme constituencies.

Constituency profile 
The seat broadly comprises two very contrasting areas - the massive post-war built council estate in Wythenshawe (once the biggest in Europe), eight miles south of Manchester city centre, and the eastern half of the more suburban, middle-class and affluent Sale, particularly in Brooklands, the constituency's biggest Tory ward. But the similarly named ward in Manchester is currently held by Labour, as are other areas around Wythenshawe such as Woodhouse Park, Baguley and Sharston, with the Priory and Sale Moor wards from Trafford also usually inclined to Labour. The southernmost Woodhouse Park ward is the largest in size as it contains mostly uninhabited area at Manchester Airport alongside the parish of Ringway, and there are green spaces at Sale Water Park and the park around the Tudor-era manor house Wythenshawe Hall.

The Wythenshawe area has historically suffered from some severe social and economic problems (the former ward of Benchill was assessed as the most deprived in the country in the Index of Multiple Deprivation 2000).

Members of Parliament

Elections

Elections in the 2010s

Elections in the 2000s

Elections in the 1990s

See also 
 List of parliamentary constituencies in Greater Manchester

References 

Parliamentary constituencies in Manchester
Parliamentary constituencies in Greater Manchester
Constituencies of the Parliament of the United Kingdom established in 1997
Politics of Trafford
Wythenshawe